Kesheng Township (Mandarin: 柯生乡) is a township in Henan Mongol Autonomous County, Huangnan Tibetan Autonomous Prefecture, Qinghai, China. In 2010, Kesheng Township had a total population of 3,017: 1,546 males and 1,471 females: 764 aged under 14, 2,108 aged between 15 and 65 and 145 aged over 65.

References 

Township-level divisions of Qinghai
Huangnan Tibetan Autonomous Prefecture